During the 2000–01 English football season, Stockport County F.C. competed in the Football League First Division.

Season summary
Stockport started the 2000–01 season poorly and were sitting 23rd in the table with just two wins at the middle of November. However, a run from mid-March resulted in Stockport winning five of their remaining nine league games to again narrowly avoid relegation, finishing 19th overall.

Final league table

Results
Stockport County's score comes first

Legend

Football League First Division

FA Cup

League Cup

First-team squad
Squad at end of season

Left club during season

Reserve squad

References

Stockport County F.C. seasons
Stockport County